The doctrine of priest–penitent privilege does not apply in England. However, before the Reformation, England was a Roman Catholic country and the Seal of the Confessional had great authority in the English courts.

Anglo-Saxon England
In Anglo-Saxon England, there several laws concerning confession. The laws of Edward the Elder, son of Alfred the Great, enjoin:

This injunction is repeated in the forty-fourth of the secular laws of King Canute. These laws are prefaced thus: "This then is the secular law which by the counsel of my witan I will that it be observed all over England".

The laws of King Ethelred the Unready declare (V, 22):

The very close connexion between the religion of the Anglo-Saxons and their laws, many of which are purely ordinances of religious observance enacted by the state, the repeated recognition of the supreme jurisdiction of the Pope, and the various instances of the application in the Church in England of the laws of the Church in general lead to the opinion that the ecclesiastical law of the secrecy of confession was recognized by the law of the land in Anglo-Saxon England.

After the Norman Conquest
In the period between the Norman Conquest and the Reformation the law of the Church in general, as to the inviolability of the seal of confession, is stringently enjoined by English councils. The Council of Durham (1220) declared as follows:

The Provincial Council of Oxford, held in 1222, contains a similar canon, in which degradation is prescribed for any breach of the seal. The law, as laid down by the 21st canon of the Lateran Council, is also declared in the Acts of the Synod of Exeter in 1287 (Spelman, Concilia, II, 357).

The fact that the laws of the Church were so emphatic on the subject, coupled with the fact that the Church was then the Church of the nation, affords good ground for inferring that the secular courts recognized the seal. The recognition of it would not have rested on any principle of immunity from disclosure of confidential communications made to clergymen. It would have rested on the fact that confession was a sacrament, on the fact of that necessity for it which the doctrine of the Church laid down, on the fact of the practice of it by both king and people, and on the fact that the practice was wholly a matter of spiritual discipline and one, moreover, in regard to which the Church had so definitely declared the law of absolute secrecy.

It is stated by some, among others by the Commissioners appointed to report upon the ecclesiastical courts in their report published in 1883, that the ecclesiastical courts in England did not regard themselves as bound by the rules of canon law framed by the Church outside England, by the various papal decrees, rescripts etc. But the Commissioners add that these courts paid great respect and attention to these rules, decrees etc. There seems to be so much weighty evidence against this view that it is difficult to accept it. Sir Frederick Pollock and Professor Frederic William Maitland in their joint History of English Law (I, 94 and 95) say that the jus commune or common law of the universal Church was the law of the Church in England. In this connexion important material is contained in the Provinciale of William Lyndwood (Oxford, 1679), arguably the only great English canonist.

The Provinciale
The Provinciale consists of the provincial constitutions of fourteen Archbishops of Canterbury from Stephen Langton (d. 1228) to Henry Chichele (d. 1443). When Lyndwood was engaged on this compilation he was the principal official of the Archbishop of Canterbury. He had been, also, the prolocutor of the clergy in the Convocation of Canterbury.

Maitland, in his essays on Roman Canon Law in the Church of England, expresses the opinion that the ecclesiastical courts in England regarded the general body of canon law, including the various papal decrees and rescripts and the commentaries of the various great writers, as their law, which they had to administer. In citing Lyndwood as providing grounds for this opinion Maitland says: "At any rate he will state the law which he administers in the chief of all the English ecclesiastical courts".

In the Provinciale there is a constitution of "Walter, Archbishop of Canterbury", apparently Walter Reynolds, transferred from the See of Worcester in 1313. The constitution begins with a prohibition to priests who have fallen into mortal sin to say mass without first going to confession and warning them against imagining, as some believers erroneously do, that mortal sins are forgiven by the general confession made in the recitation of the Confiteor. It continues as follows:

Lyndwood on confession
Lyndwood gives the following commentary on  Walter Reynolds' constitution,  occurring upon the word "Confession":

Dealing with the priest's being found guilty of revealing a confession, he says:

He states that Henry de Bohic:

Lyndwood then continues as follows:

Upon the word "generaliter" there is the following comment:

He cites Hostiensis in support. It is to be observed that there is nowhere an exception in respect of the crime of treason. His commentary on the duty of not disclosing the confession of a crime proposed to be committed tends to show that he would not have recognized any such exception.

Pupilla oculi
A manual, called Pupilla oculi (see Gasquet, Pre-Reformation Essays), which appears to have been mainly designed for practical use among the clergy, was compiled towards the end of the fourteenth century by John de Burgh, a professor of theology and Chancellor of the University of Cambridge. According to Edward Badeley who wrote in 1865 a most able pamphlet on the privilege of the seal of confession entitled The Privilege of Religious Confessions in English Courts of Justice, this manual, to which Maitland also refers, enjoyed great popularity. Its counsels to confessors who may happen to be witnesses in a court of justice are sufficiently like those already cited from Lyndwood's Provinciale to render it unnecessary to quote them.

Analysis from the Catholic Encyclopedia
The Catholic Encyclopedia provides the following analysis:

The Catholic Encyclopedia goes on to quote Maitland on what it regards as "remarkable evidence of the acceptance of the decrees of the Council of Lateran in England". Speaking of trial by ordeal he says:

The order, thereupon, proceeds to suggest certain rules for the judges to follow.

Sources

Attribution

Canon law history
History of Catholicism in England
Legal history of England
Priest–penitent privilege in England
Medieval English law
Christianity in medieval England